Mănăstirea Humorului is a commune located in Suceava County, Bukovina, northeastern Romania. It is composed of three villages, namely: Mănăstirea Humorului, Pleșa, and Poiana Micului. The 16th-century Humor Monastery is located in the commune.

Demographics 

At the 2011 census, 79.3% of inhabitants were Romanians, 19.6% Poles, and 1% Germans (more specifically Bukovina Germans).

Slovaks settled in Poiana Micului in 1841–1842. Later, part of the community migrated to other areas of Bukovina. The Austrian census of 1890 recorded 50.9% of villagers as Polish speakers. The 1930 Romanian census found 45.3% were ethnic Poles. In 1936, a Slovak Catholic priest arrived from Czechoslovakia and began preaching in Slovak. From that point, some villagers began to identify as Slovak, while others insisted on their Polish identity. The Romanian authorities were drawn in, sending a Slovak schoolteacher, while the Polish Legation at Bucharest intervened on the side of the Polish villagers.

A survey of Slavic villagers taken in autumn 1937 found 67.1% declaring as Poles, and 32.9% as Slovaks. In 1942, the Catholic bishop of Iași estimated that half his parishioners there were Poles, half Slovaks. The 1948 census found 256 (67.9%) Polish speakers in Poiana Micului, and a total of 12 Czech and Slovak speakers in all of Câmpulung County.

Administration and local politics

Communal council 

The commune's current local council has the following political composition, according to the results of the 2020 Romanian local elections:

Notes

References 

 Philippe Henri Blasen, ”Între poloni și slovaci: oscilarea națională în Poiana-Micului (1936–1942)”, in Anca Filipovici (ed.), Polonezii din România: repere identitare, pp. 133–74. Cluj-Napoca: Editura Institutului pentru Studierea Problemelor Minorităților Naționale, 2020, 

Communes in Suceava County
Localities in Southern Bukovina
Polish communities in Romania